Creation is a solo piano album by American pianist and composer Keith Jarrett containing music selected and sequenced (by himself) from improvised solo concerts that took place in Japan, Canada, and Europe in April–July 2014." It was released by ECM Records in May 2015.

2014 solo concerts
According to www.keithjarrett.org, in 2014 Jarrett played a total of 10 solo piano concerts. Creation consists of different tracks recorded in 6 of those concerts.

 February 5 - Isaac Stern Auditorium, Carnegie Hall, New York City (USA)
 April 30 - Orchard Hall, Bunkamura, Tokyo (Japan) [Creation Part #9]
 May 3 - Festival Hall, Osaka (Japan)
 May 6 - Orchard Hall, Bunkamura, Tokyo (Japan) [Creation Part #6]
 May 9 - Kioi Hall, Tokyo (Japan) [Creation Parts #2, #5]
 June 25 - Roy Thomson Hall, Toronto (Canada) [Creation Part #1]
 June 28 - Maison Symphonique, Montréal (Canada)
 July 4 - Salle Playel, Paris (France) [Creation Part #3]
 July 8 - La Fenice, Venice (Italy)
 July 11 - Auditorium Parco della Musica, Rome (Italy) [Creation Parts #4, #7-8 ]

Reception
Cormack Larkin of The Irish Times noted: "Even so, it's four years since his last solo release, the joyously exuberant Rio. This latest is more subdued, a selection of sometimes brooding but occasionally sublime ruminations, culled from live performances around the world in 2014, amounting to an unintended suite many Romantic-era classical composers would have been happy to have written."

John Fordham of The Guardian wrote: "In its pensive melodies and post-Romantic chord voicings, Creation is a very different proposition to the jubilant Rio. It comprises selections from six different 2014 concert performances in four cities, reordered to make a nine-part suite that sounds like a free-flowing single work. Some sections unfold as treble ripples turning to ballad-like songs, while glimpses of gospel chord-changes surface and then evaporate, and rolling, low-register ostinatos gently modulate. It's dark, and sometimes melancholy, but as usual with Jarrett, full of improvised motifs that suggest long-forgotten songs. ECM are simultaneously releasing a set of Jarrett's classical interpretations of music by Samuel Barber and Bartók".

Jazz critic Ivan Hewett of  The Telegraph focuses his analysis on Jarrett's apparent declining career, the lack of blues, jazz changes and the absence of virtuoso finger-work:

Track listing 
Part I – Live at Roy Thomson Hall, Toronto - 8:17
Part II – Live at Kioi Hall, Tokyo - 7:40
Part III – Live at Salle Pleyel, Paris - 6:59
Part IV – Live at Auditorium Parco della Musica, Rome - 7:33
Part V – Live at Kioi Hall, Tokyo - 7:13
Part VI – Live at Orchard Hall, Tokyo - 9:25
Part VII – Live at Auditorium Parco della Musica, Rome - 8:17
Part VIII – Live at Auditorium Parco della Musica, Rome - 8:36
Part IX – Live at Orchard Hall, Tokyo - 8:30

Music by Keith Jarrett

Personnel 
 Keith Jarrett - piano

Production
 Keith Jarrett - producer
 Manfred Eicher - executive producer, engineer (mastering)
 Martin Pearson - engineer (recording)
 Ryu Kawashima - engineer (recording in Tokyo)
 Christoph Stickel - engineer (mastering)
 Sascha Kleis - design
 Eberhard Ross - cover painting

Charts

References 

Keith Jarrett albums
2015 live albums
Live instrumental albums
ECM Records live albums
Solo piano jazz albums